Luckett & Farley is an architecture, engineering, and interior design firm based in Louisville, Kentucky. It was founded in 1853, making it (along with SmithGroup) the oldest continually operating architecture firm in the United States that is not a wholly owned subsidiary. The firm began under the name Rogers, Whitestone & Co., Architects, changing its name to Henry Whitestone in 1857, to D.X. Murphy & Brother in 1890, and to Luckett & Farley in 1962. The company is 100% employee-owned as of January 1, 2012  and concentrates on automotive, industrial, federal government, higher education, health and wellness, and corporate/commercial markets. There are more LEED professionals at Luckett & Farley than any other company in Kentucky with 50, as of December 2012.

History

The Whitestone period

Henry Whitestone (1819–1893) was born at Clondegad House in County Clare, Ireland. He immigrated to the United States amidst famine and depression  with his wife Henrietta in January 1852 from Innis, Ireland after he was recommended to Isaiah Rogers (1800–1869), for his work on the County Clare Courthouse. Rogers was an architect based in Cincinnati who came to be known as "the father of the American hotel". Whitestone's first project with Rogers was the Frankfort Hotel in Frankfort, Kentucky and a partnership formed in November 1853 when Rogers was contracted to rebuild the recently burned Louisville Hotel. Whitestone moved from Frankfort to Louisville and received 2/5 of all profits from the services he performed with Rogers.

The first office of Isaiah Rogers and Henry Whitestone was located at Bullit and Main Streets, near where the Riverfront Plaza/Belvedere is located today. Together they transformed Louisville into a "five-story city" and introduced the Italianate architectural style to the region. Whitestone separated from Rogers in 1857 and soon became the preeminent architecture firm in Louisville through the 1880s. Notably, Charles J. Clarke worked for Henry Whitestone during the Civil War and later formed a partnership with Arthur Loomis, to form the historically significant Louisville architecture firm Clarke and Loomis.

Whitestone retired in approximately 1881 and died in 1893. An 1893 publishing of The American Architect and Building News wrote of Whitestone,

"...forty years ago, in the prime of life, he was in the active practice of his profession, erecting buildings in that perennial style of Italian Renaissance, of which he was a master, and from which he was never lured by passing fashion."

He is buried at Cave Hill Cemetery in Louisville Kentucky alongside his wife and two daughters (Section C, lot 39). A marker located on Main St., across from the old Louisville Hotel, bears his name.

The D.X. Murphy era
Dennis Xavier ("D.X.") Murphy (11/3/1853-8/27/1933), was born in Louisville after his parents immigrated from Ireland, began working as a draftsman at age 16 for Henry Whitestone. By 1874 he was the head draftsman and eventually took over the practice in 1880 just before Whitestone's retirement. It was at this point that the firm was renamed D.X. Murphy. His brothers James C. Murphy (1865-1935), later joined the practice in 1890 at which time the firm became D.X. Murphy and Brother. Their younger brother Peter C. Murphy subsequently joined and together they designed many of Louisville's Catholic Churches, among many other notable buildings, for significantly reduced fees on the order of 1% of construction costs. The Murphy's sister, Sr. Mary Anselm, was a nun with the Sisters of Charity of Nazareth in Bardstown, Kentucky  which likely led to many of the commissionings.

The firm's most famous work was that of the Twin Spires at Churchill Downs in 1895, designed by 24-year-old Joseph D. Baldez and constructed in time for the 21st Kentucky Derby.

It was known for the grandstand (as well as the spires) of Churchill Downs, the Galt House Hotel and distillery buildings along what became Louisville's Whiskey Row, and numerous other office buildings, schools, hospitals, and churches, some of which survive and are listed on the National Register of Historic Places (NRHP) for their architecture.

Works include:
Galt House Hotel
Bernheim Distillery (c.1896)
Combined Distillers of Kentucky (c.1905-1906)
Bonnie Brothers Distillery (c.1903-1912)
The Phil. Hollenbach Company (c.1889), 528 Main, which in 2023 was home of the Evan Williams Bourbon Experience
Cathedral of the Assumption (1852), 443 S. 5th St. Louisville, KY (Keely, William; Murphy, D.X.) Gothic Revival. NRHP-listed
Churchill Downs, 700 Central Ave. Louisville, KY (Murphy, D.X. & Co.), NRHP-listed
Inter-Southern Insurance Building (1913), 239-247 S. 5th St. Louisville, KY (with Brinton B. Davis), NRHP-listed 
Jefferson Branch Louisville Free Public Library, 1718 W. Jefferson St. Louisville, KY, NRHP-listed
Jefferson County Jail, 514 W. Liberty St. Louisville, KY, NRHP-listed
Kentucky Wagon Works, 2601 S. 3rd St. Louisville, KY, NRHP-listed
National Tobacco Works Branch Stemmery, 2410-18 W. Main St., Louisville, NRHP-listed
National Tobacco Works Branch Drying House, 2400 W. Main St., Louisville, NRHP-listed
Presentation Academy, 861 S. 4th St., Louisville, NRHP-listed
Snead Manufacturing Building, 817 W. Market St., Louisville,, NRHP-listed
Stockyard Exchange Building (1914), Louisville, Beaux Arts, in NRHP-listed Butchertown Historic District
One or more works in Savoy Historic District, 209--221 W. Jefferson St., Louisville, NRHP-listed

Dennis Murphy died in 1933 and is buried at St. Louis Cemetery in Louisville.

In 1935 D.X. Murphy and Brother was sold by James Murphy's wife to D.X. Murphy and Brother Incorporated for a sum of $1,147, at which time Peter Murphy became president. By 1943, Peter Murphy was named chairman of the board and William G. O'Toole became president. Thomas D. Luckett II (1909 – 1996) became majority stakeholder in the firm upon O'Toole's passing in 1956 while Jean D. Farley (b. 1927) was named Vice President.

D.X. Murphy and Bro., Inc became Luckett & Farley, Inc on May 25, 1962, with T.D. Luckett and J.D. Farley sharing ownership.

D.X. Murphy occupied the old Louisville Trust Building (208 S. 5th St) until 1962 when the office was relocated to the Washington Building (4th and Market), which has since been demolished.

The Filson Historical Society in Louisville holds architectural drawings and other records of the D.X. Murphy and Brother firm and its predecessors.

Luckett & Farley

By the time the firm was renamed Luckett & Farley Inc. in 1962 to reflect the change of ownership, civil and structural engineering services were also provided; Mechanical and electrical engineering services were added in 1970 in order to deliver better-coordinated construction documents to clients. By 1973 the firm name was changed to Luckett & Farley Architects, Engineers, and Construction Managers, Inc. and by the end of 1982, Jean Farley sold the company to Dennis Dewitt, Ronald Kendall, and Douglas Wilkerson.

In 2000 an employee stock ownership plan (ESOP) was formed and by 2002, leadership was transferred to Ed Jerdonek, Belinda Gates, Gail Miller, and Rob Diamond. A design-build subsidiary, LFDB, was created in 1999 but has since separated with the company as of 2011. Belinda Gates retired from Luckett & Farley in 2010. On January 1, 2012, Jerdonek, Miller, and Diamond sold their interest in the company to the employee-owners, making Luckett & Farley 100% employee-owned. 
Luckett & Farley occupied the Washington Building from 1963 to 1968 when it moved to 215 W. Breckinridge and again in 1997 to their current location in the Prince Wells Building at 737 S. Third St.

Luckett & Farley uses building information modeling technology to produce its drawings.

Departments
Departments consist of the following fields: 
 Architecture
 Interior Design & Procurement
 Structural Engineering
 Civil Engineering
 Mechanical Engineering
 Electrical Engineering
 Building Commissioning

Presidents

Rogers & Whitestone's work in Louisville (1853–1880)

Partial list of work by D.X. Murphy & Brother in Louisville (1880–1933)

Awards
 Luckett & Farley has been awarded one of Kentucky's best places to work in 2009, 2010, 2011, 2012, 2013, 2014 and 2015.
 In 2012, it was named one of Louisville's best places to work by The Courier-Journal.
 In 2014, Luckett & Farley was awarded the 2014 ESOP Company of the Year by the Ohio/Kentucky ESOP Association Chapter

References

External links

Google Map of Henry Whitestone and DX Murphy buildings in Louisville
Timeline of Firm History

Architecture firms based in Kentucky
Companies based in Louisville, Kentucky
Design companies established in 1853
1853 establishments in Kentucky
American companies established in 1853